Daqian is a town in Daozhen Gelao and Miao Autonomous County, Guizhou, China.

Administrative division
As of 2016, the town is divided into six villages:
 Daqian
 Qianba
 Fuxing
 Wenjiaba
 Sanyuan

Geography

References

Bibliography

Towns of Zunyi